The 2015–16 Ligue 1 season was the 78th season of the Ligue de Football Professionnel first division since its establishment. It started on 7 August 2015 and concluded on 14 May 2016. Paris Saint-Germain were the defending champions, and retained the title with a 9–0 win at Troyes on 13 March. It was their fourth consecutive Ligue 1 title.

Teams
There were 20 clubs in the league, with three promoted teams from Ligue 2 replacing the three teams that were relegated from Ligue 1 following the 2014–15 season. All clubs that secured Ligue 1 status for the season were subject to approval by the DNCG before becoming eligible to participate. Originally, only two teams were planned to be relegated at the end of the season. However, this proposal was appealed and eventually overturned, so as in past seasons, three teams are to be relegated. Evian, Metz and Lens were relegated to Ligue 2 at the conclusion of the 2014–15 season. Troyes, Gazelec Ajaccio and Angers were promoted to the top level. Troyes returned after being relegated in 2012–13 season. Gazelec Ajaccio secured their second consecutive promotion and joined Ligue 1 for the first time in the club's history. Angers returned to the top level after 21 years.

Stadia and locations

Personnel and kits

Managerial changes

League table

Results

Season statistics

Top goalscorers

Hat-tricks

Note
4 Player scored 4 goals

Attendances in first part of season

References

External links 
 

Ligue 1 seasons
1
Fra